The first government of Alfonso Fernández Mañueco was formed on 17 July 2019, following the latter's election as President of the Junta of Castile and León by the Cortes of Castile and León on 9 July and his swearing-in on 12 July, as a result of the People's Party (PP) and Citizens (Cs) being able to muster a majority of seats in the Cortes following the 2019 Castilian-Leonese regional election.

Until 2021, the cabinet comprised members of the PP and Cs, to become the first coalition government to be formed in the region. On 20 December 2021, regional president Mañueco expelled all Cs members from the cabinet under a pretext to call a snap regional election. It was automatically dismissed on 14 February 2022 as a consequence of the 2022 regional election, but will remain in acting capacity until the next government is sworn in.

Investiture

Cabinet changes
Mañueco's first government saw a number of cabinet changes during its tenure:

 On 25 May 2020, Germán Barrios announced his resignation as Minister of Employment and Industry, citing "insurmountable differences" with regional vice president Francisco Igea. He was succeeded in his post by Ana Carlota Amigo on 28 May, with Carlos Fernández Carriedo (from the PP) serving in acting capacity until she could be sworn into office.
 On 20 December 2021, Mañueco expelled all four Cs members from his cabinet and announced a snap regional election for 13 February citing "stability concerns" and mistrust on his coalition partner, a move to which Cs replied with outrage.

Council of Government
The Council of Government is structured into the offices for the president, the vice president, nine ministries and the post of the spokesperson of the Government.

Departmental structure
Alfonso Fernández Mañueco's first government was organised into several superior and governing units, whose number, powers and hierarchical structure varied depending on the ministerial department.

References

2019 establishments in Castile and León
2022 disestablishments in Castile and León
Cabinets established in 2019
Cabinets disestablished in 2022
Cabinets of Castile and León